Ronald Murray Gould (born October 17, 1946) is an American lawyer and jurist serving as a U.S. circuit judge of the U.S. Court of Appeals for the Ninth Circuit since 1999.

Education and legal training 

Gould was born in 1946 in St. Louis, Missouri. He graduated from the University of Pennsylvania with a Bachelor of Science. He attended the University of Michigan Law School, graduating in 1973 with a Juris Doctor.

Legal career 
After graduating from law school, Gould clerked for Judge Wade H. McCree of the United States Court of Appeals for the Sixth Circuit from 1973 to 1974 and for Justice Potter Stewart of the U.S. Supreme Court from 1974 to 1975.
Gould was in private practice for Perkins Coie in Seattle, Washington from 1975 to 1999 and served as an adjunct professor at the University of Washington Law School from 1986 to 1989. He was a partner at Perkins Coie at the time of his appeals court nomination. He also was president of the Washington State Bar Association.

Federal judicial service 

Gould was nominated by President Bill Clinton for a seat vacated by Judge Robert Beezer of the United States Court of Appeals for the Ninth Circuit on January 26, 1999. He was confirmed by the United States Senate on November 17, 1999, in a voice vote and received his commission on November 22, 1999.

Notable cases 

On July 13, 2013, Gould dissented from a denial of en banc rehearing when the Ninth Circuit upheld a ban on Greenpeace's protest against shell drilling. Gould, who was joined by Pregerson, Reinhardt, Wardlaw, Fletcher, and Milan Smith, saw this as a huge violation of 1st amendment rights, writing "The panel majority's contrary conclusion will undermine the freedom of an organization to "stimulate [its] audience with spontaneous and emotional appeals for unity and action in a common cause.""  

On August 23, 2019, Gould was one of three judges to rule that a prisoner with gender dysphoria had a right to sex reassignment surgery under the Eighth Amendment. Judge Margaret McKeown and district judge Robert Lasnik, sitting by designation, joined the opinion. The full Ninth Circuit refused to rehear the case en banc, although eight judges, all Republican appointees, dissented from the denial of rehearing.

Personal life 

While still in private practice, Gould was diagnosed with multiple sclerosis. During his time on the bench, he lost the use of his arms and legs; he now relies on a wheelchair for mobility, and with the aid of other technologies and of assistants and clerks is able to "get a good result in the work I'm doing." Gould is Jewish.

See also 
List of Jewish American jurists
List of law clerks of the Supreme Court of the United States (Seat 8)

References

External links 

1946 births
Living people
20th-century American judges
21st-century American judges
Judges of the United States Court of Appeals for the Ninth Circuit
Law clerks of the Supreme Court of the United States
Lawyers from St. Louis
People associated with Perkins Coie
People with multiple sclerosis
United States court of appeals judges appointed by Bill Clinton
University of Michigan Law School alumni
University of Pennsylvania alumni
University of Washington School of Law faculty
Jewish American attorneys